Python of Aenus (fl. 4th-century BCE) was a Greek philosopher and a former student of Plato. Around 360 BC, he and his brother Heraclides assassinated Cotys I, the ruler of Thrace.

Based on Demosthenes's Against Aristocrates, Python of Aenus was identified as Python of Byzantium, a Greek statesman. However, it is highly unlikely that both names are attributed to the same person.

References

4th-century BC Greek people
4th-century BC philosophers
Academic philosophers
Ancient Thracian Greeks
Students of Plato